Ibrahim Mahudhee Hussain (born 22 August 1993) is a Maldivian professional footballer who plays as a striker for TC Sports Club.

Career
He started his football career at his boyhood club F.C. Habeys, leading them to glory in various tournaments in which he played. This lead him to represent S. Feydhoo at Zone level in Minivan Championship, before joining TC Sports in 2017.

International
Mahudhee was first called up for Maldives national football team in March 2017 for 2019 AFC Asian Cup qualification match against Palestine at home, but was on bench as an unused substitute. He made his debut against Palestine on 14 November 2017, in the 2019 AFC Asian Cup qualification match away from home. He came in as a 66th minute substitute for Ahmed Rizuvan.

International goals
Scores and results list Maldives' goal tally first.

Honours

Maldives
SAFF Championship: 2018

References

External links
 
 
 Ibrahim Mahudhee Hussain at worldfootball.com

1993 births
Living people
Maldivian footballers
Association football midfielders
Maldives international footballers
Maziya S&RC players
T.C. Sports Club players